Nicole Eustace is an American historian who won the 2022 Pulitzer Prize for History and was a finalist for the 2021 National Book Award for Nonfiction.

She graduated from the University of Pennsylvania. She is professor at New York University.

Works 

 1812: War and the Passions of Patriotism, University of Pennsylvania Press, May 2012. 
 ed. with Fredrika J. Teute, Warring for America: Cultural Contests in the Era of 1812, UNC Press, 2017. 
 Covered with Night: A Story of Murder and Indigenous Justice in Early America, W. W. North & Company, 2021.

References 

American women historians
Pulitzer Prize for History winners
21st-century American historians
21st-century American women writers
University of Pennsylvania alumni
New York University faculty
Year of birth missing (living people)
Living people